Cassava common mosaic virus (CsCMV) is a plant pathogenic virus.

External links 
 ICTVdB - The Universal Virus Database: Cassava common mosaic virus
 Family Groups - The Baltimore Method

Viral plant pathogens and diseases
Potexviruses